Barbara Borys-Damięcka (born 2 November 1937) is a Polish politician. She was elected to the Senate of Poland (10th term) representing the constituency of Warsaw. She also served in the 7th, 8th and 9th terms of the Senate of Poland.

References 

Living people
1937 births
Place of birth missing (living people)
20th-century Polish politicians
21st-century Polish politicians
20th-century Polish women politicians
21st-century Polish women politicians
Members of the Senate of Poland 2007–2011
Members of the Senate of Poland 2011–2015
Members of the Senate of Poland 2015–2019
Members of the Senate of Poland 2019–2023
Women members of the Senate of Poland